Strahinja "Braca" Alagić (14 August 1924 – 10 October 2002) was a Serbian professional basketball player and coach. He dedicated his coaching career is the most to women's basketball. With Crvena zvezda he won the FIBA EuroLeague Women in 1979.

Alagić was a member of the first managing board of the Crvena zvezda basketball club.

Playing career 
Alagić started playing basketball after the end of World War II as a member of the Yugoslav Army basketball team. The first Yugoslav national championship held in Subotica in 1945 where his team won the title by beating the Serbia selection in the finals. Next year he moved to newly formed basketball club Partizan together with seven teammates such as Aleksandar Nikolić and Mirko Marjanović.

After spending a year in Partizan, Alagic moved to Crvena zvezda where he played the longest and where he achieved major successes. In the period from 1947 to 1951 he won five national championships with Nebojša Popović, Srđan Kalember and others. In July 1950, he won an international cup tournament with the Zvezda in Milan, Italy.

Coaching career 
After ending his playing career, Alagić devoted himself to coaching. First of all Alagić worked as a coach of women's team, although he briefly coached the Crvena zvezda men's team. With women's team of Crvena zvezda he had a lot of success, especially in national competitions. The most important club's success in the history of women's basketball is winning the European Cup in 1979 with Crvena zvezda.

Alagić had a big success with the Yugoslavia women's national team, which in 1968 led to the first medal in Eurobasket.

Career achievements

Player 
 Yugoslav League champion: 6 (with Yugoslav Army: 1945 and with Crvena zvezda: 1947, 1948, 1949, 1950, 1951).

Coach
 Yugoslav Women's League champion: 10 (with Crvena zvezda: 1958, 1959, 1960, 1972–73, 1975–76, 1976–77, 1977–78, 1978–79, 1979–80, 1980–81)
 Yugoslav Women's Cup winner: 4 (with Crvena zvezda: 1973–74, 1975–76, 1978–79, 1980–81)
 FIBA Women's European Champions Cup winner: 1 (with Crvena zvezda: 1978–79).

See also 
 List of EuroLeague Women winning coaches
 List of Red Star Belgrade basketball coaches

References

1924 births
2002 deaths
KK Crvena zvezda head coaches
KK Crvena zvezda players
KK Crvena Zvezda executives
KK Partizan players
KK Radnički Kragujevac (1950–2004) coaches
OKK Beograd coaches
Serbian men's basketball coaches
Serbian men's basketball players
ŽKK Crvena zvezda coaches
Yugoslav men's basketball players
Yugoslav basketball coaches
Serbs of Bosnia and Herzegovina